In Greek mythology, Telegone (Ancient Greek: Τηλεγόνην) was the daughter of Pharis, son of Hermes and the Danaid Phylodameia. She bore to the river-god Alpheus, a son, Orsilochus who later became the father of Diocles. The latter's children, Orsilochus and Crethon, fought in the Trojan War and were killed by Aeneas.

Notes

References 
 Homer, The Iliad with an English Translation by A.T. Murray, Ph.D. in two volumes. Cambridge, MA., Harvard University Press; London, William Heinemann, Ltd. 1924. . Online version at the Perseus Digital Library.
 Homer, Homeri Opera in five volumes. Oxford, Oxford University Press. 1920. . Greek text available at the Perseus Digital Library.
 Lucius Mestrius Plutarchus, Moralia with an English Translation by Frank Cole Babbitt. Cambridge, MA. Harvard University Press. London. William Heinemann Ltd. 1936. Online version at the Perseus Digital Library. Greek text available from the same website.

Women in Greek mythology
Characters in Greek mythology